Lucrezia Elena Cevoli (11 November 1685 – 12 June 1767) was an Italian Roman Catholic professed religious of the Capuchin Poor Clares. She served as the order's abbess after the death of Veronica Giuliani. She later assumed the name of "Florida" after she joined religious life. She devoted her energies to the maintenance of the order in Umbria and carried out her assigned tasks with strong zeal and diligence.

Cevoli's beatification was held in 1993.

Life
Lucrezia Elena Cevoli was born on 11 November 1685 in Pisa to Count Curzio and Countess Laura della Seta. Her education in Pisa was – in 1697 – entrusted to the Sisters of Saint Martin's College.

Upon the news that Cevoli wanted to enter religious life in 1703 Cosimo III stated that "she will not succeed" for he was certain that she would not overcome the difficulties of such a different and austere life instead of the comfortable life she led as a noble. Her first contact with the Capuchin Poor Clares was more difficult than she had believed it would be for the mistress Veronica Giuliani – future saint – was inclined not to receive her. Yet she was received since she had a sincere vocation and had passed all the requirements of admission and began her novitiate on 8 June 1703. Cevoli took her vows on 10 June 1705 and selected a new name for her new life.

Giuliani became the abbess in 1716 and it was Cevoli – now known as "Florida" – who served at her side as a vicar; she was appointed as such in 1716. With the death of Giuliani she succeeded her until her own death; she continued the work started under her predecessor and did not use strong and harsh impositions to do so. Instead she did so with a degree of both firmness and gentleness which was a stark contrast to that of Giuliani. Cevoli also served as a chief promoter of the canonization cause of Giuliani.

Cevoli died on 12 June 1767 after a month of a burning fever. The examination of her remains after her death showed unusual markings on the sides of her chest but her heart appeared to be normal. However some effects were seen on her aorta that were inexplicable as being a natural phenomena.

Beatification
The beatification process commenced on 1 June 1838 and the commencement bestowed upon Cevoli the title Servant of God. This ushered in the two processes that saw documents gathered and also witness testimonies. Both were ratified to proceed and all documentation went to the Congregation of Rites. She was proclaimed to be Venerable on 19 June 1910 after Pope Pius X recognized that she had lived a life of heroic virtue.

The miracle required for beatification to take place was investigated in a diocesan tribunal and was ratified in 1991. The miracle was approved on 13 June 1992 and Pope John Paul II beatified Cevoli in 1993.

References

External links
Hagiography Circle

1685 births
1767 deaths
17th-century venerated Christians
18th-century venerated Christians
Italian beatified people
Beatifications by Pope John Paul II
People from Pisa
Capuchin Poor Clares
Poor Clare abbesses